is a Rinzai Zen temple of the Kenchō-ji school in Kita-Kamakura, Kanagawa, Japan. Famous for its hydrangeas, it's also known as The Temple of Hydrangeas (ajisai-dera). The main object of worship is goddess Shō Kannon (聖観音).

History 

Meigetsu-in was built by Uesugi Norikata of the powerful Uesugi clan, and the name itself derives from Norikata's own posthumous name (Meigetsu). According to 350-year-old records it was originally just the guest rooms of a much bigger temple called  which was closed by the government during the Meiji period. Zenkō-ji was a temple of considerable prestige, being one of the Rinzai Zen temples classified as (which were second in importance only to Kamakura's so-called Five Mountains (. Zenkō-ji however didn't survive the anti-Buddhist clampdown (Haibutsu kishaku) that followed the Meiji Restoration. Meigetsu-in is the owner of a famous 13th century statue of Uesugi Shigefusa, founder of the Uesugi clan. He is dressed in the picturesque clothes of the dignitaries of the Kamakura period. The statue is a National Treasure.

Points of interest 

 The temple itself with its beautiful round window (see photo below)
 The temple's garden contains one of the celebrated , the Kame no I (瓶の井) 
 The karesansui, a garden of raked sand, rocks and plants representing legendary Buddhist Mount Shumi.
 The yagura cave dug on the side of a hill is the largest in Kamakura. The small tower at its center is thought to be Norikata's tomb
 Hōjō Tokiyori's grave
 The hydrangeas in the garden. The flowers, however famous, are apparently just a recent addition. They were reportedly chosen because of the ease with which they grow.

Getting there 

 Get off at JR Yokosuka Line's Kita-Kamakura Station. Walk about ten minutes towards Kamakura on the left side of the train tracks following the signs. Meigetsu-in is on a side street to your left.

See also 
 For an explanation of terms concerning Japanese Buddhism, Japanese Buddhist art, and Japanese Buddhist temple architecture, see the Glossary of Japanese Buddhism.

Notes

References 

 
 Kita Kamakura, Kamakura Citizen Network accessed on March 29, 2008
 明月院, Japanese Wikipedia accessed on March 29, 2008

External links 
 Kamakura Trip website "Meigetsu-in Temple" page (in English)

Buddhist temples in Kamakura, Kanagawa
Kenchō-ji temples